Ludwig Lange (born 21 June 1863 in Gießen; died 12 July 1936 in Weinsberg) was a German physicist.

Biography
He was the son of the philologist and archaeologist Ludwig Lange and his wife Adelheide Blume. He studied mathematics, physics, and also psychology, epistemology, ethics at the University of Leipzig and the University of Gießen from 1882-1885. He was an assistant of Wilhelm Wundt from 1885-1887 and attained his Ph.D. in 1886. He worked for many years as a Privatdozent, and in the field of photography. From 1887 he exhibited growing symptoms of a nervous disease. In 1936 he died in a psychiatric hospital (Klinikum am Weissenhof) in Weinsberg.

Legacy
Lange is known for inventing terms like inertial frame of reference and inertial time (1885), which were used by him instead of Newton's "absolute space and time". This was very important for the development of relativistic mechanics after 1900. DiSalle describes Lange's definition in this way:

Works

Notes

References

External links

1863 births
1936 deaths
University of Giessen alumni
Leipzig University alumni
19th-century German physicists
Deaths in mental institutions